Martin Baes, latinised as Bassius (fl. 1604–1637) was a Flemish engraver and printmaker who mainly worked for publishers in a number of cities.  He worked on a number of religious publications that were aimed at English Catholics.

Life
Very little is known about the life of this artist.  On stylistic grounds it is assumed that he trained as an engraver in Antwerp.  He was therefore possibly a native of Antwerp.  Martin Baes worked for the publishers in Saint-Omer in 1614, Tournai in 1617, Arras in 1623 and Douai in 1618-1623.

Most of what is known about him is based on his surviving works. He primarily produced portraits. He possibly died in Doornik.

References

External links

Flemish engravers
Artists from Antwerp
Year of birth unknown
Year of death unknown